Pentre-bach is a small village in the  community of Lampeter, Ceredigion, Wales. Pentre-bach is represented in the Senedd by Elin Jones (Plaid Cymru) and is part of the Ceredigion constituency in the House of Commons.

References

External links
Places of Interest in Ceredigion, ceredigion.gov.uk

Villages in Ceredigion